Aeneator valedictus is a species of sea snail, a whelk, a marine gastropod mollusc in the family Buccinidae, the true whelks.

References

 Powell A W B, New Zealand Mollusca, William Collins Publishers Ltd, Auckland, New Zealand 1979 

Buccinidae
Gastropods of New Zealand
Gastropods described in 1886